Jonathan Dixon may refer to:

Jonathan Dixon (actor) (born 1988), British actor, also known as Jonny Dixon
Jonathan Dixon (judge) (1839–1906), American jurist and politician from New Jersey
Jonathan N Dixon (born 1972), Australian film director, producer and writer
Jonny Dixon (born 1984), English footballer

See also
John Dixon (disambiguation)